Garreau is a French surname. Notable people with the surname include:

 Georges Garreau (1902–1986), French diver at the 1924 Olympics
 Joel Garreau (born 1948), American journalist and writer
 Lazare Garreau (1812 – 1892), French plant physiologist
 Ludovic Garreau (born 1983), French ice hockey coach and former player

See also
Éliane Jeannin-Garreau (1911–1999), French Resistance member

French-language surnames